James Derivaz (born 31 August 1973) is a retired Swiss football striker and later manager.

References

1973 births
Living people
Swiss men's footballers
FC Martigny-Sports players
Servette FC players
FC Monthey players
FC Sion players
FC Stade Nyonnais players
Étoile Carouge FC players
Association football forwards
Swiss Super League players
FC Martigny-Sports managers